K. Ravindran (born 1 October 1989, in Port Dickson is a Malaysian footballer currently playing for KSR Sains in Malaysia M3 League.

Malaysia Super League 2012

References

External links
 
 Profile at Sarawak FA Official Website

1989 births
Living people
Association football forwards
Malaysian footballers
MISC-MIFA players
People from Negeri Sembilan
Malaysian people of Indian descent
Negeri Sembilan FA players